Joan Lascorz Moreno (born 27 February 1985) is a former Spanish motorcycle racer. He competed in the Supersport World Championship from 2005 to 2010 and in the Superbike World Championship in 2011 and 2012.

Racing career 
Born in L'Hospitalet de Llobregat near Barcelona, Lascorz won the 1995 Catalan Pocket Bike Championship. He raced scooters and 125ccs in his home country, before switching back to Supermoto for 2004, winning the Spanish Championship in this field. He concentrated fully on Supersport after this, having 2 successful seasons in the domestic championship on Hondas.

Lascorz and his Glaner Motocard.com team moved up to World Supersport for 2007. Lascorz and the team took time to adjust and were only 18th overall despite a podium finish at Vallelunga. He started 2008 with a bang, finishing second in the season opener in Losail, Qatar (briefly leading on the run to the line, before the more-powerful factory bike of Broc Parkes overtook him) before winning the season's third race at Valencia to briefly lead the championship, after most other major contenders had at least one non-finish in the first three races. The works Honda and Yamaha teams ultimately overhauled him in the standings, and he finished 5th overall after a further podium at the final round.

For 2009, Lascorz and the Motocard team gained factory Kawasaki support, with Katsuaki Fujiwara joining the team and support from former race winner Pere Riba. He scored four podiums, and also led at Imola when the engine failed.

Lascorz and Fujiwara remained with the team for 2010. A championship challenge against the Hondas of Eugene Laverty and Kenan Sofuoğlu was mounted early on, but a collision with Laverty and Roberto Tamburini at the start at Silverstone left him with multiple injuries.

In 2011 he moved to Superbike World Championship with Kawasaki finishing in 11th position in the championship overall.

After a good start to the 2012 Superbike World Championship, Lascorz was involved in a serious accident in post-race testing at the Autodromo Enzo e Dino Ferrari, which involved Lascorz crashing into an unprotected concrete wall near the track at nearly 200 km/h. Despite the best efforts of multiple medical teams, Kawasaki Racing Team released an update in August 2012 confirming what many initially expected- Lascorz had been paralysed, and will be unable to walk again. Commenting on his injuries, Lascorz stated that "What happened to me is a shame. I’m not sure if it was bad luck or that conditions in Imola were not suitable for a 240 HP bike. In any case, it is undoubtedly a full stop for my career as a SBK racer, and a period in my life. It's a very difficult situation and I have to be very strong to go ahead. I want to thank for the endless support I'm getting: all motorcycle riders both in SBK and MotoGP, and all the other categories. I also want to thank all the racing fans, and the amateur and professional bikers that have shown me examples of their affection."

In 2013 Lascorz has joined a team of sports commentators, and he is covering the World Superbikes series on the Spanish television.

Career statistics

Supersport World Championship

Superbike World Championship
(key) (Races in bold indicate pole position) (Races in italics indicate fastest lap)

British Superbike Championship

References

External links
 Profile on World Superbike official site

Spanish motorcycle racers
Motorcycle racers from Catalonia
Sportspeople from Tarragona
Living people
1985 births
Superbike World Championship riders
Supersport World Championship riders
British Superbike Championship riders
People with paraplegia
Spanish people with disabilities